Yarralin, also known as Walangeri, is a remote Aboriginal community in the Northern Territory of Australia. At the 2016 census, Yarralin had a population of 293.

The community is diverse, with several indigenous language groups including Gurindji, Ngarinyman, Bilinara and Mudburra represented among the residents of Yarralin. Archeological evidence and oral histories of the area surrounding the modern community indicate that Yarralin was (and remains) an important link in a traditional network for trade and exchange of goods and culture between indigenous peoples across the Northern Territory.

Yarralin is a service centre for the surrounding area and facilities available in the community include a school, health clinic, post office, police station, airstrip, community store and sports fields.

References

Towns in the Northern Territory
Aboriginal communities in the Northern Territory